The 2022–23 Ranji Trophy is the 88th season of the Ranji Trophy, the premier first-class cricket tournament in India. It is contested by 38 teams, divided into four elite groups and a plate group, with eight teams in Group C. The tournament was announced by the Board of Control for Cricket in India (BCCI) on 8 August 2022.

Points table

Fixtures

Round 1

Round 2

Round 3

Round 4

Round 5

Round 6

Round 7

References

Ranji Trophy seasons